Do Par or Dowpar may refer to:
 Do Par Barzian
 Dowpar Nazari
 Dowpar-e Qabr-e Kiamars